FC Lugano is a Swiss football club based in Lugano. The club was refounded as AC Lugano in 2004 as a result of relegation and the financial situation of FC Lugano, which was founded in 1908. In 2008, the club reverted to its original name, FC Lugano. They play at the Stadio Cornaredo. They have played in what is now the Swiss Super League during the periods of 1922–53, 1954–60, 1961–63, 1964–76, 1979–80, 1988–97, 1998–02, and from 2015 until present.

History

Football Club Lugano was formed on 28 July 1908 under the leadership of then-president Ernesto Corsini. Promotion to the highest Swiss Super League came for the first time in 1922, and after several years of relegations and promotions, the team won its first Swiss Cup in 1931. The following decade, FC Lugano was able to win 3 national titles (1938, 1941 and 1949).

For the first fifty years of its existence, Lugano played at the Campo Marzio – which opened on 13 September 1908 – but its success prompted the city to build a new stadium, and so on 26 August 1951, the Cornaredo Stadium was inaugurated, which has a capacity of 15,000.

In 1968, Lugano won the Swiss Cup and hence the team participated in the Cup Winners' Cup. Two years later the team took part in the UEFA Cup.

In 1993, Lugano won its third Cup against Grasshoppers, later participating in the Cup Winners' Cup, in which it reached second qualifying round. In the 1995–96 season, Lugano participated in the UEFA Cup, eliminating Jeunesse Hautcharage in the first round and Inter Milan in the second.

The club was declared bankrupt in 2003 and forcibly removed from the league. Due to the bankruptcy, the team was renamed AC Lugano and fielded under-21 players, having been forced to sell or release the senior team to pay off the club's debts. In 2004, the club merged with Malcantone Agno, and it was decided that Lugano would re-enter the Swiss football system in the Swiss Challenge League. Morotti Joseph, the president of Malcantone Agno, was entrusted with the leadership of the new club.

In 2007, the company was bought by a group led by Giambattista Pastorello. Luido Bernasconi became the new president.
On 4 June 2008, the club's centenary year, the general meeting of shareholders voted on a name change. The historical name of Football Club Lugano was reinstated.
In 2015 FC Lugano was promoted to the Swiss Super League.

On August 18, 2021, it was announced that American billionaire and owner of the Chicago Fire FC, Joe Mansueto, had purchased FC Lugano and that the Fire and FC Lugano were to work together as sister clubs. On 1 September 2021, assistant coach Mattia Croci-Torti took over coaching duties at the club, replacing Abel Braga. The first season under new ownership would immediately prove successful, as they were able to win their first title after 29 years, winning the 2021–22 Swiss Cup.

European record

Players

Current squad

Other players under contract

Out on loan

Honours
Swiss Super League
Champions: 1937–38, 1940–41, 1948–49
Swiss Cup
Winners (4): 1930–31, 1967–68, 1992–93, 2021–22
Swiss Challenge League
Winners: 2014–15

Former coaches

1937–41: József Winkler
1947–50: Béla Volentik
1951–52: Tullio Grassi
1952–53: Béla Volentik
1953–55: Béla Sárosi 
1957–58: Ragnar Larsen 
1959–60: Tullio Grassi
1962–63: György Sárosi 
1970–71: Albert Sing 
1971–73: Otto Luttrop 
1973–74: Otto Luttrop 
1974–75: Alfredo Foni 
1976–77: Alfredo Foni 
1977–79: Oscar Massei
1979–80: Istvan Szabo
1980–81: Antun Rudinski 
1983–85: Otto Luttrop 
1992–94: Karl Engel
1997–98: Karl Engel
1999: Enzo Trossero 
1999–2000: Giuliano Sonzogni
2002–03: Pierluigi Tami
2004–05: Vladimir Petković 
2007–10: Simone Boldini 
2010–11: Marco Schällibaum 
2011–12: Francesco Moriero 
2012–13: Raimondo Ponte 
2013: Sandro Salvioni
2013–15: Livio Bordoli
2015–16: Zdeněk Zeman
2016: Andrea Manzo
2016–17: Paolo Tramezzani
2017–18: Pierluigi Tami
2018: Guille Abascal 
2018–19: Fabio Celestini 
2019–21: Maurizio Jacobacci 
2021: Abel Braga 
2021–present: Mattia Croci-Torti

References

External links
  

 
Football clubs in Switzerland
FC Lugano
FC Lugano
Association football clubs established in 1908
1908 establishments in Switzerland